The third season of the reimagined science fiction television series Battlestar Galactica premiered on the Sci-Fi Channel in the United States on October 6, 2006, and concluded on March 25, 2007. Unlike the previous season, it was not split into two parts and did not have an extended hiatus during the middle of the season. The third season contained 20 episodes.

Cast and characters

Main cast
 Edward James Olmos as William Adama
 Mary McDonnell as Laura Roslin
 Katee Sackhoff as Kara "Starbuck" Thrace
 Jamie Bamber as Lee "Apollo" Adama
 James Callis as Gaius Baltar
 Tricia Helfer as Number Six
 Grace Park as Sharon "Boomer" Valerii/Sharon "Athena" Agathon (Number Eight)
 Michael Hogan as Saul Tigh
 Aaron Douglas as Galen Tyrol
 Tahmoh Penikett as Karl "Helo" Agathon
 Nicki Clyne as Cally Henderson Tyrol
 Kandyse McClure as Anastasia Dualla
 Alessandro Juliani as Felix Gaeta

Recurring cast
 Donnelly Rhodes as Sherman Cottle
 Rekha Sharma as Tory Foster
 Callum Keith Rennie as Leoben Conoy (Number Two)
 Lucy Lawless as D'Anna Biers (Number Three)
 Dean Stockwell as John Cavil (Number One)
 Matthew Bennett as Aaron Doral (Number Five)
 Rick Worthy as Simon (Number Four)
 Richard Hatch as Tom Zarek
 Kate Vernon as Ellen Tigh
 Michael Trucco as Samuel Anders
 Mark Sheppard as Romo Lampkin
 Leah Cairns as Margaret "Racetrack" Edmondson
 Bodie Olmos as Brendan "Hot Dog" Costanza
 Luciana Carro as Louanne "Kat" Katraine
 Jennifer Halley as Diana "Hardball" Seelix

Episodes
<onlyinclude>{{Episode table |background=#39525A |overall=5 |season=5 |title=20 |director=19 |writer=21 |aux1=9 |airdate= 18|aux1T=Survivorcount |episodes=

{{Episode list/sublist|Battlestar Galactica (season 3)
 |EpisodeNumber = 39
 |EpisodeNumber2 = 6
 |Title = Torn
 |DirectedBy = Jean de Segonzac
 |WrittenBy = Anne Cofell Saunders
 |OriginalAirDate = 
 |Aux1 = 41,422
 |ShortSummary = As Starbuck and Tigh seed discontent among Galactica'''s crew, Baltar attempts to help the Cylons deal with a virus spreading among their race.
 |LineColor = 39525A
}}

{{Episode list/sublist|Battlestar Galactica (season 3)
 |EpisodeNumber = 43
 |EpisodeNumber2 = 10
 |Title = The Passage
 |DirectedBy = Michael Nankin
 |WrittenBy = Jane Espenson
 |OriginalAirDate = 
 |Aux1 = 41,420
 |ShortSummary = When the fleet's food supply is contaminated, Galactica's pilots must lead the ships through a hazardous star cluster. Meanwhile, Kat must suddenly confront a dark secret from her past.
 |LineColor = 39525A
}}

}}</onlyinclude>

Production
The Sci-Fi Channel ordered a 20-episode third season on November 16, 2005, with production beginning in April 2006 in Vancouver, British Columbia. The season premiered in the United States on October 6, 2006, in Canada the following day, and in the UK on January 9, 2007; with the first two episodes being shown together. The broadcast schedule for season three did not include a long hiatus in the middle of the season, as with season two. The Sci-Fi Channel moved the series to Sundays on January 21, 2007, the first time the show had changed nights since it began airing.

Reception
Critical response
The season received universal acclaim from critics, scoring 94 out of 100 based on 14 reviews from Metacritic. On Rotten Tomatoes, the season has an approval rating of 100% with an average score of 9 out of 10 based on 20 reviews. The website's critical consensus reads, "Dark, charming and unusually thoughtful, Battlestar Galacticas third season continues to improve on the show's most addictive elements."

The series also placed on numerous critics top ten lists of both 2006 and 2007 by publications such as the Chicago Tribune, Entertainment Weekly, Newsday, The New York Times and TV Guide.

Accolades
The third season received four Emmy Award nominations: Outstanding Writing for a Drama Series (Ronald D. Moore for "Occupation / Precipice"), Outstanding Directing for a Drama Series (Félix Enríquez Alcalá for "Exodus, Part 2"), Outstanding Sound Editing for a Series ("Exodus, Part 2"), and won for Outstanding Special Visual Effects for a Series for "Exodus, Part 2", the series' first Emmy win. Ronald D. Moore was also nominated for a Writers Guild of America Award for Episodic Drama for "Occupation / Precipice".

Home video releases
The third season was released on DVD in region 1 on March 18, 2008, in region 2 on September 3, 2007 and in region 4 on November 20, 2007. It was also released on Blu-ray Disc in region 1 on July 27, 2010.

The sets include all 20 episodes from the third season, plus an extended 25-minute longer version of "Unfinished Business". Special features include creator Ronald D. Moore's podcast commentaries for all 20 episodes. Actors Grace Park and Tahmoh Penikett join Moore for his podcast commentary on "Unfinished Business", and Moore's wife Terry Dresbach appears frequently throughout the podcasts as well. Moore also provides a new commentary track for the extended version of "Unfinished Business". Executive producer and writer David Eick provides commentary for "Hero". Bonus podcasts for the final three episodes are also included—writer Michael Angeli and actor Mark Sheppard on "The Son Also Rises" and Sheppard himself on both parts of "Crossroads". Also included is the ten-part webisode series Battlestar Galactica: The Resistance'', deleted scenes for various episodes, and 22 of David Eick's videoblogs.

References

External links
 
 

2
2006 American television seasons
2007 American television seasons